WD repeat domain 18 is a protein that in humans is encoded by the WDR18 gene.

Function 

This gene encodes a member of the WD repeat protein family. WD repeats are minimally conserved regions of approximately 40 amino acids typically bracketed by gly-his and trp-asp (GH-WD), which may facilitate formation of heterotrimeric or multiprotein complexes. Members of this family are involved in a variety of cellular processes, including cell cycle progression, signal transduction, apoptosis, and gene regulation.
WDR18 forms a nucleolar complex with LAS1L, PELP1, TEX10 called the rixosome which is involved in RNA degradation. The rixosome is a nucleolar complex that cofractionates with the 60S preribosomal subunit. Recruitment of the rixosome by the Polycomb Repressive Complex 1 has been proposed to lead to its functioning in establishing repressive chromatin structures by assisting in degrading nascent RNA.

References